Ulugqat County (also known as Ulughchat County and Wuqia County) is a county in Xinjiang Uygur Autonomous Region, China. It is under the administration of the Kyrgyz autonomous prefecture of Kizilsu. The county has two towns, nine townships and one state-owned farm, eight communities and 34 villages under its jurisdiction in 2017, its county seat is Wuqia Town.

Wuqia County is one of the two westernmost counties in China. It borders with Artux City to the east, Kashgar City to the south, Akto County to the southwest and the Kyrgyz Republic to the northwest. There are two national-level ports of Turugart and Arkaxtam, which are the link between Central and Western Asia and the bridgehead of opening up to the outside world. The county has harsh natural conditions, dry climate, earthquakes, floods, snow storms, sandstorms and other frequent natural disasters. From 1905 to the present, there have been 56 recorded earthquakes with a major earthquake of magnitude 6.0  or above, and more than 20,000 earthquakes of magnitude below 6.0 .

There are 11 local ethnic groups in the county, such as Kyrgyz, Han, Uyghur, Hui, Uzbek, Tajik, etc. and the Kyrgyz ethnic group accounts for about 80% of the total population of the county. Its total land area of the county is 19,118 square kilometers with an average elevation of 2,890 meters and its county seat is at 2,200 meters above sea level. Of which, mountains, Gobi and wasteland account for 99.8% of the total area; the total area of desert grassland is more than 10,667 square kilometers, arable land is 23,000 mu (1,533 hectares), per capita arable land is less than 0.5 mu (333 square meters). It is a typical plateau animal husbandry county with traditional animal husbandry as the main county.

Name

Th name Ulugqat is from the Kyrgyz language and means  branch valleys. The name Wuqia is Mandarin Chinese for an abbreviated form of the name Wulukeqiati, based on the sound of the Kyrgyz name. It is named after that the Kizilsu Valley divides into two separate branch valleys in the area and the place presents the shape of the three mountain valleys.

History

The county of Wuqia was part of Shule Commandery in the Han period. It was in the territory of First Turkic Khaganate in the mid-sixth century, Uyghur Khaganate in the 8th century, Kyrgyz Khaganate  in 40s of the 9th century and Yarkent Khanate in the 16th century.

It was part of Shufu County in the Qing period. The Ulugqat Branch  was formed from Shufu County in 1913 and the town of Ulugqat was its seat, Ulugqat Branch was changed to Ulugqat Division  in 1929 and the county of Wuqia was established in 1938 and under administration of Kashgar Administrative Region. The county was amalgamated to Kizilsu Autonomous Prefecture with its establishment in 1954.

A magnitude 7.4 earthquake occurred in Wuqia County on August 23, 1985, and its county seat was destroyed. Later, the new county seat was rebuilt in Borux, 6 km away to the northeast of the former seat. The inauguration ceremony of the new seat was held on October 17, 1989.

On October 5, 2008, a 6.8 magnitude earthquake collapsed 721 houses; there were no casualties. 100 residents were relocated to emergency shelters; another 100 were to live in newly-built homes.

Demographics

Geography

Wuqia County is located between 39°24′- 40°17′ north latitude and 73°40′- 75°45′ east longitude. It is located in the west of Xinjiang, north of Pamir Plateau, west of Tarim Basin, and two major mountain ranges of southern Tianshan and Kunlun junction. It is adjacent to Artux City in the east, Kashgar City in the south and Akto County in the southwest, it is bordered by the Kyrgyz Republic on the northwest with a boundary line of 410 kilometers.  The county is in a temperate arid climate zone, the total area of the county is 19,118 square kilometers, with 10,667 square kilometers of various grasslands, of which 60% of excellent grasslands. There are two national first-level ports of Turugart and the Arkaxtam. The 309 provincial road connects the two ports with Kyrgyzstan, which is a shortcut for import and export trade between China and Central Asian countries.

As of 2013, proven lead and zinc reserves of six million tons, natural gas reserves of 40.9 billion cubic meters, copper reserves of 600,000 tons, coal 12.75 million tons, gold 130 tons, iron seven million tons, limestone and gypsum reserves of 100 million tons, water energy resources one million kilowatts. In July 2014, a 100-ton super-large gold mine was discovered in the county. Wuqia County has two major rivers of the Kizi River  and the Qakmark River  with a surface water resource of 960 million cubic meters.

Terrain

The terrain of Wuqia County is low in the southeast, high in the northwest and southwest, surrounded by mountains. It is a typical mountainous terrain with an altitude of 1,760 - 6,146 meters and a horseshoe shape. The county is located in the wedge-shaped zone in the west of the Kashgar Delta, which is a fold mountains of the Miocene. The landform appears in the mountains of erosion. The mountain area accounts for 76% of the total area of Wuqia County, 14,535 square kilometers. The county is surrounded by mountains on three sides, and the southeast is the Kashgar Delta plain.

Animal resources
Wild animal resources in Wuqia County include snow leopard, brown bear, goitered gazelle, wild boar, marmot, snow chicken, and chukar partridge.

Medicinal plant resources
Wild medicinal plant resources include symphytum, liquorice, ferula sinkiangensis, ephedra sinica, plantago, codonopsis, angelica, dandelion, astragalus, cynomorium, and wolfiporia extensa.

Mineral resources
The mineral resources discovered in Wuqia County include coal, fossil oil, oil shale, iron, copper, lead, zinc, antimony, gold, phosphorus, salt, sulfur, limestone, gypsum, ceramic soil and so on. Among them, coal reserves account for more than half of Kizilsu's coal reserves.

Climate

Subdivision

The county was divided into two towns and nine townships, and a pasture farm run by the XPCC.

 Wuqia Town
 Kangsu Town
 Ulugqat Township (ئۇلۇغچات يېزىسى )
 Oksalur Township
 Jigin Township
 Boritokay Township (بۆرىتوقاي يېزىسى )
 Kiziloy Township (قىزىلئۆي يېزىسى )
 Baykurut Township (بايقۇرۇت يېزىسى )
 Bostanterak Township
 Terak Township
 Toyun Township
 Toyun Ranch, 3rd Division of Xinjiang Production and Construction Corps

Tourism

Wucai County is located in Tianshan, Kunlun Mountains at the intersection of the Pamir Plateau, the natural landscape is unique, the border ethnic customs rich, with a unique folk customs, geological features. There are the last place in mainland China sunset - Simhana, there is Tianshan and Kunlun intersection of the Grand Canyon's majestic landscape, there are well-known Yuqitash Steppe, Hongshan Valley, Quanhua, Shanghai Forest Ranch, Oksalur Township Millennium populus euphratica forest, shell mountain of ancient sea ruins, earthquake-resistant monument and other tourist attractions. Pamir is one of the birthplaces of highland culture. The main ethnic group of the neighboring Kyrgyz Republic and the Chinese Kyrgyz have formed the unique and profound advantage of human resources open to Central Asia in Wucai County.

Notable persons
 Ishaq Beg Munonov

References 

County-level divisions of Xinjiang
Kizilsu Kyrgyz Autonomous Prefecture